Brian Douge (born 2 March 1951) is a former Australian rules footballer who played with Hawthorn in the Victorian Football League (VFL).

Douge played mostly in the back pocket but never really established himself in the Hawthorn side until the 1973 season. He played in Hawthorn's premiership side in 1976, with the Grand Final against North Melbourne being his last game.

He was captain-coach of Subiaco in 1977 and 1978.

References

External links

1951 births
Living people
Hawthorn Football Club players
Hawthorn Football Club Premiership players
Australian rules footballers from Victoria (Australia)
Subiaco Football Club players
Subiaco Football Club coaches
One-time VFL/AFL Premiership players